The English comic singer, monologist and actor, Stanley Holloway (1890–1982), had a 54-year recording career, beginning in the age of acoustic recording, and ending in the era of the stereophonic LP. He mainly recorded songs from musicals and revues, and he recited many monologues on various subjects. Most prominent among his recordings (aside from his participation in recordings of My Fair Lady) are those of three series of monologues that he made at intervals throughout his career. They featured Private Sam Small, young Albert Ramsbottom and his family, and historical events such as the Battle of Hastings, Magna Carta and the Battle of Trafalgar.  In all, his discography runs to 130 recordings, spanning the period 1924 to 1978.  A review in The Gramophone of one of his 1957 albums containing recordings of his old "concert party" songs commented, "what a fine voice he has and how well he can use it – diction, phrasing, range and the interpretative insight of the artist".

Recordings
{| class="wikitable sortable" style="font-size: 90%; width: 100%;"
!Number
!Details
!Recent album on which featured
!Year Recorded
|-
|The Missus and I
|By John C. Holloway. from The Co-Optimists
|Highlights From The Co-Optimists  (2008)
|1922
|-
|The Cobbler
|By Herman Lohr. from The Co-Optimists 
|Highlights From The Co-Optimists  (2008)
|1923
|-
|Tommy The Whistler
|By Ernest Melvin. from The Co-Optimists 
|Highlights From The Co-Optimists  (2008)
|1923
|-
|The Wheel Tapper
|By Wolseley Charles. from The Co-Optimists 
|Highlights From The Co-Optimists  (2008)
|1923
|-
|Pirate Song
|By H F Gilbert. from The Co-Optimists 
|Highlights From The Co-Optimists  (2008)
|1923
|-
|Cloze props
|By Wolseley Charles. from The Co-Optimists 
|Highlights From The Co-Optimists  (2008)
|1924
|-
|Alouette
|By E. Melvin. Duet With Gilbert Childs from The Co-Optimists 
|Highlights From The Co-Optimists  (2008)
|1924
|-
|London Town 
|By Melville Gideon. from The Co-Optimists 
|Highlights From The Co-Optimists  (2008)
|1924
|-
|In an old World Garden
|Duet With Melville Gideon.
|Highlights From The Co-Optimists  (2008)
|1924
|-
|Memory Street
|By, and sung in duet with, Elsa Macfarlane. from The Co-Optimists
|Highlights From The Co-Optimists  (2008)
|1924
|-
|Down Love Lane
|By, and sung in duet with, Elsa Macfarlane. from The Co-Optimists
|Highlights From The Co-Optimists  (2008)
|1924
|-
|Till the Wheel Comes Off
|From The Co-Optimists
|Highlights From The Co-Optimists  (2008)
|1925
|-
|Roundabouts and Swings
|From The Co-Optimists
|Highlights From The Co-Optimists  (2008)
|1925
|-
|Sometimes I'm Happy, Sometimes I'm Blue 
|By Vincent Youmans from the musical Hit the Deck
|Stanley Holloway At His Very Best (2008)
|1927
|-
|Join the Navy
|From Hit the Deck
|Stanley Holloway At His Very Best (2008)
|1927
|-
|Fancy Me Just Meeting You
|From Hit the Deck
|
|1927
|-
|Sam, Sam, Pick oop thy Musket
|By Stanley Holloway
|Stanley Holloway:The Essential Collection (2007)
|1928
|-
|Song of the Sea
|From the musical Song of the Sea
|Stanley Holloway The Best Of (2002)
|1928
|-
|Lovely ladies
|Duet with Claude Hulbert from Song of the Sea
|
|1928
|-
|Rude Sailor
|From Song of the Sea 
|
|c.1929
|-
|Little Pal
|
|
|c.1929
|-
|My Old Dutch
|Originally performed by Albert Chevalier
|Beat The Retreat (2008)
|c.1929
|-
|Come to the Cookhouse Door
|
|
|c.1929
|-
|Coaling
|
|
|c.1929
|-
|Old Sam 
|By Stanley Holloway
|Stanley Holloway:The Essential Collection (2007)
|1930
|-
|Alt! Who Goes There?
|By Stanley Holloway
|Stanley Holloway:The Essential Collection (2007)
|1930
|-
|I Thowt Mebbe I Would And I Did
|By Ernest Melvin
|Stanley Holloway At His Very Best (2008)
|1930
|-
|What Care I?
|By Billy Mayerl
|Stanley Holloway:The Essential Collection (2007)
|1930
|-
|Beat the Retreat on thy Drum
|By R. P. Weston and Bert Lee
|Stanley Holloway:The Essential Collection (2007)
|1931
|-
|One Each Apiece All Round
|By Stanley Holloway
|Stanley Holloway:The Essential Collection (2007)
|1931
|-
|Brahn Boots
|By Weston and Lee 
|Stanley Holloway:The Essential Collection (2007)
|1931
|-
|The Lion and Albert
|By Marriott Edgar
|Stanley Holloway:The Essential Collection (2007)
|1932
|-
|Hi-De-Hi
|
|Stanley Holloway The Best Of (2002)
|1932
|-
|Penny On The Drum
|By Stanley Holloway
|Penny On The Drum (2006)
|1932
|-
|Three Ha'pence a Foot
|By Marriott Edgar
|Stanley Holloway:The Essential Collection (2007)
|1932
|-
|A Dinder Courtship 
|By Frederic Weatherly and Eric Coates
|Beat The Retreat (2008)
|1932
|-
|Onaway awake Beloved
|From Hiawatha's Wedding Feast music by Samuel Coleridge-Taylor based on the poem The Song of Hiawatha by Henry Wadsworth Longfellow
|
|1932
|-
|Pass Everyman
|
|
|1932
|-
|King John
|By Stanley Holloway 
|
|1933
|-
|Sam's Medal
|By Mabel Constanduros and Michael Hogan
|Stanley Holloway:The Essential Collection (2007)
|1933
|-
|Old Sam's Party
|By Mabel Constanduros
|Stanley Holloway:The Essential Collection (2007)
|1933
|-
|Runcorn Ferry
|By Marriott Edgar
|Stanley Holloway:The Essential Collection (2007)
|1933
|-
|Many Happy Returns
|By Archie de Bear
|Stanley Holloway:The Essential Collection (2007)
|1933
|-
|Radio Stars In A Jam
|Holloway attempts to recite "Pick oop thy Musket" but is interrupted by, amongst others, Clapham & Dwyer, Elsie & Doris Waters, Will Hay and Tommy Handley 
|
|1933
|-
|Gunner Joe
|By Marriott Edgar
|Stanley Holloway:The Essential Collection (2007)
|1933
|-
|With Her Head Tucked Underneath Her Arm
|By R.P Weston and Bert Lee 
|Stanley Holloway:The Essential Collection (2007)
|1934
|-
|Marksman Sam
|By Marriott Edgar and Stanley Holloway
|Stanley Holloway:The Essential Collection (2007)
|1934
|-
|Sam Goes to It
|By Stanley Holloway
|Stanley Holloway:The Essential Collection (2007)
|1934
|-
|Signalman Sam
|By Stanley Holloway
|
|1934
|-
|The Return of Albert
|By Marriott Edgar
|Stanley Holloway:The Essential Collection (2007)
|1934
|-
|Hand in Hand
|By Jerome Kern and Oscar Hammerstein II from the musical Three Sisters
|Penny On The Drum (2006)
|1934
|-
|Keep Smiling
|By Jerome Kern and Oscar Hammerstein II from the musical Three Sisters
|Stanley Holloway - Keep Smiling (2006)
|1934
|-
|Sam's Parrott
|By V.F. Stevens and Lauri Bowen 
|
|1934
|-
|The Beefeater
|By Weston and Lee 
|Stanley Holloway:The Essential Collection (2007)
|1934
|-
|The Famous Name of Small
|By V.F. Stevens and Lauri Bowen
|
|1935
|-
|Sam Drummed Out
|by Weston and Lee 
|Stanley Holloway:The Essential Collection (2007)
|1935
|-
|Sam's Sturgeon
|By Ashley Sterne
|Stanley Holloway:The Essential Collection (2007)
|1935
|-
|Sam Small at Westminster
|By Stanley Holloway
|Beat The Retreat (2008)
|1935
|-
|St. George and the Dragon
|By Weston and Lee 
|
|1935
|-
|Down Below
|By Sydney Carter 
|
|1936
|-
|Mr. & Mrs. Ramsbottom Went Off 
|By Marriott Edgar; accompanied by Carroll Gibbons
|
|1936
|-
|The Jubilee Sovrin
|By Marriott Edgar 
|Stanley Holloway:The Essential Collection (2007)
|1937
|-
|The 'Ole in the Ark
|By Marriott Edgar
|Stanley Holloway:The Essential Collection (2007)
|1937
|-
|Albert and the 'Eadsman
|By Marriott Edgar
|Stanley Holloway:The Essential Collection (2007)
|1937
|-
|The Battle of Hastings
|By Marriott Edgar
|
|1937
|-
|Jonah and the Grampus
|By Marriott Edgar
|Stanley Holloway:The Essential Collection (2007)
|1937
|-
|My Word, You Do Look Queer
|By R. P. Weston and Bert Lee
|
|1938
|-
|The Parson of Puddle
|By Greatrex Newman
|Stanley Holloway:The Essential Collection (2007)
|1938
|-
|Green-Eyed Dragon
|By Greatrex Newman and Wolseley Charles
|
|1939
|-
|Old Sam's Christmas Pudding 
|By Marriott Edgar. Written especially for the 1939 Christmas pantomime Mother Goose in which Holloway was starring
|Stanley Holloway:The Essential Collection (2007)
|1939
|-
|The Recumbent Posture
|By Marriott Edgar
|Stanley Holloway:The Essential Collection (2007)
|1939
|-
|The Negro Preacher
|
|Stanley Holloway:The Essential Collection (2007)
|1939
|-
|Albert Evacuated
|By Stanley Holloway.  Tells the story of child evacuation during the war 
|Stanley Holloway:The Essential Collection (2007)
|1940
|-
|Yorkshire Pudden!
|By Weston and Lee 
|Penny On The Drum (2006)
|1940
|-
|Careless Talk
|Duet with Leslie Henson
|Stanley Holloway:The Essential Collection (2007)
|1940
|-
|Marksman Sam
|By Marriott Edgar 
|Penny On The Drum (2006)
|1940
|-
|Pukka Sahib
|By Reginald Purdell, based on The Green Eye of the Yellow God by J. Milton Hayes 
|
|1940
|-
|The Return of Albert
|By Stanley Lupino 
|Stanley Holloway:The Essential Collection (2007)
|1940
|-
|Sam's Christmas Shopping
|By Pulham J. Sherman
|
|1940
|-
|The Food demonstration 
|Recorded on behalf of the British government in aid of the war effort
|
|c.1940
|-
|Lend to Defend
|Recorded on behalf of the British government in aid of the war effort
|
|c.1940
|-
|Save your way to Victory
|Recorded on behalf of the British government in aid of the war effort
|
|1940
|-
|Sam Goes to It
|By Marriott Edgar
|Stanley Holloway At His Very Best (2008)
|1941
|-
|No Like-a da War
|Piano accompaniment by W.T. Best
|Stanley Holloway At His Very Best (2008)
|1941
|-
|Uppards
|By Marriott Edgar 
|Stanley Holloway:The Essential Collection (2007)
|1941
|-
|The Future Mrs 'awkins
|Originally performed by Albert Chevalier, 1898
|Stanley Holloway:The Essential Collection (2007)
|1942
|-
|Guarding the Gasworks
|By Stanley Holloway
|Stanley Holloway:The Essential Collection (2007)
|1942
|-
|My Missus
|
|Stanley Holloway:The Essential Collection (2007)
|1943
|-
|Don't waste bread
|by Stanley Holloway. Recorded on behalf of the British government in aid of the war effort
|
|1943
|-
|Albert and His Savings
|By Marriott Edgar.  Recorded on behalf of the British government in aid of the war effort
|Stanley Holloway:The Essential Collection (2007)
|1944
|-
|How long hast thou been Grave Maker 
|By William Shakespeare with Laurence Olivier.  Taken from the film Hamlet released the same year
|Stanley Holloway:The Essential Collection (2007)
|1948
|-
|Albert Down Under
|By Stanley Holloway especially for his tour of Australia.
|Not released
|1948
|-
|Sam's Guggle Box
|By Stan Masters and Harry Stogden 
|
|1951
|-
|A Midsummer Nights Dream
|By William Shakespeare. Audiobook, featuring Moira Shearer, Robert Helpmann and Micheal Benthall
|A Midsummer Nights Dream by William Shakespeare (2009)
|1954
|-
|Going To The Derby
|Unknown
|Stanley Holloway: Champagne Charlie (2011)
|1954
|-
|My Lord Tomnoddy
|By R. H. Barham c.1820 
|Stanley Holloway: Champagne Charlie (2011)
|1954
|-
|Act on the Square Boys
|Written and originally performed by Alfred Vance in 1866 
|Stanley Holloway: Champagne Charlie (2011)
|1954
|-
|If I Had A Donkey
|Unknown 
|Stanley Holloway: Champagne Charlie (2011)
|1954
|-
|The Workhouse Boy
|Unknown 
|Stanley Holloway: Champagne Charlie (2011)
|1954
|-
|Married To A Mermaid
|By James Thomson and David Mallet c.1740 
|Stanley Holloway: Champagne Charlie (2011)
|1954
|-
|A Motto For Every Man
|By D.K.Gavan; first performed by Harry Clifton 
|Stanley Holloway: Champagne Charlie (2011)
|1954
|-
|Shelling Green Peas
|Written and performed by Harry Clifton in 1865 
|Stanley Holloway: Champagne Charlie (2011)
|1954
|-
|Hey! Betty Martin
|Unknown 
|Stanley Holloway: Champagne Charlie (2011)
|1954
|-
|All Around My Hat
|Unknown c.1820 
|Stanley Holloway: Champagne Charlie (2011)
|1954
|-
|Poor Old Horse
|By Billy Patterson, 1868 
|Stanley Holloway: Champagne Charlie (2011)
|1954
|-
|Champagne Charlie
|Written and performed by George Leybourne in 1867 
|Stanley Holloway: Champagne Charlie (2011)
|1954
|-
|With a Little Bit of Luck
|By Alan Jay Lerner and Frederick Loewe, from My Fair Lady 
|My Fair Lady Soundtrack (Original Cast) - 1995
|1956
|-

|Get Me to the Church on Time
|By Lerner and Loewe, from My Fair Lady
|My Fair Lady Soundtrack (Original Cast) - 1995
|1956
|-
|Long Ago In Alcala
|Written by Frederic Edward Weatherly & Adrian Ross. Music by André Messager.  For the 1894 opera Mirette.  With Arthur Lief (conductor and pianist) and the Concert Party Four. Recorded in New York, November 1957.
|The Concert Party -1958
|1957
|-
|On Strike
|By Charles Pond 1906. With Arthur Lief (conductor and pianist) and the Concert Party Four. Recorded in New York, November 1957.
|The Concert Party -1958
|1957
|-
|Captain Mac
|By P.J. O'Reilly and Wilfred Sanderson. With Arthur Lief (conductor and pianist) and the Concert Party Four. Recorded in New York, November 1957.
|The Concert Party -1958
|1957
|-
|The Floral Dance
|By Kate Emily Barkley ("Katie") Moss. With Arthur Lief (conductor and pianist) and the Concert Party Four. Recorded in New York, November 1957.
|The Concert Party -1958
|1957
|-
|The Christening
|By George Randell.  With Arthur Lief (conductor and pianist) and the Concert Party Four. Recorded in New York, November 1957.
|The Concert Party -1958
|1957
|-
|Albert's Reunion
|By Stanley Holloway. With Arthur Lief (conductor and pianist) and the Concert Party Four. Recorded in New York, November 1957.
|The Concert Party -1958
|1957
|-
|The Trumpeter
|By J. Francis Barron and J. Airlie Dix.  With Arthur Lief (conductor and pianist) and the Concert Party Four. Recorded in New York, November 1957.
|The Concert Party -1958
|1957
|-
|The King Who Wanted Jam For Tea
|By Greatrex Newman and Wolseley Charles.  With Arthur Lief (conductor and pianist) and the Concert Party Four. Recorded in New York, November 1957.
|The Concert Party -1958
|1957
|-
|I Thought Mebbe I Would-an' I Did
|By Ernest Melvin (1922). Previously recorded by Holloway In 1930.  With Arthur Lief (conductor and pianist) and the Concert Party Four. Recorded in New York, November 1957.
|The Concert Party -1958
|1957
|-
|The Street Watchman's Story
|By Charles J. Winter 1910; first recorded by Bransby Williams c.1914. With Arthur Lief (conductor and pianist) and the Concert Party Four. Recorded in New York, November 1957.
|The Concert Party -1958
|1957
|-
|The Green-Eyed Dragon
|By Greatrex Newman and Wolseley Charles.  With Arthur Lief (conductor and pianist) and the Concert Party Four. Recorded in New York, November 1957.
|The Concert Party -1958
|1957
|-
|Up From Somerset
|By Frederic Edward Weatherly.  With Arthur Lief (conductor and pianist) and the Concert Party Four. Recorded in New York, November 1957.
|The Concert Party -1958
|1957
|-
|Sam's Christmas Pudding
|By Marriott Edgar. Previously recorded by Holloway in 1939. With Arthur Lief (conductor and pianist) and the Concert Party Four. Recorded in New York, November 1957.
|The Concert Party -1958
|1957
|-
|Four Jolly Sailormen
|By Edward German.  With Arthur Lief (conductor and pianist) and the Concert Party Four. Recorded in New York, November 1957.
|The Concert Party -1958
|1957
|-
|Bouncing Ball
|By Milton Kaye; with the Gobblegook Symphony Orchestra
|Gobbledegook Songs (1957)
|1957
|-
|The Gobbledegook
|By Milton Kaye; with the Gobblegook S. O
|Gobbledegook Songs (1957)
|1957
|-
|The Lion Tamer 
|By Milton Kaye; with the Gobblegook S. O
|Gobbledegook Songs (1957)
|1957
|-
|Sven Svensen
|By Milton Kaye; with the Gobblegook S. O
|Gobbledegook Songs (1957)
|1957
|-
|The Frog, The Duck, The Fish
|By Milton Kaye; with the Gobblegook S. O
|Gobbledegook Songs (1957)
|1957
|-
|Wooden Shoes
|By Milton Kaye; with the Gobblegook S. O
|Gobbledegook Songs (1957)
|1957
|-
|Ump-Diddle-Diddle
|By Milton Kaye; with the Gobblegook S. O
|Gobbledegook Songs (1957)
|1957
|-
|The Elephant Alphabet
|By Milton Kaye; with the Gobblegook S. O
|Gobbledegook Songs (1957)
|1957
|-
|Pete Petersen's House
|By Milton Kaye; with the Gobblegook S. O
|Gobbledegook Songs (1957)
|1957
|-
|The Longest Train
|By Milton Kaye; with the Gobblegook S. O
|Gobbledegook Songs (1957)
|1957
|-
|Why the Giraffe Laughed
|By Milton Kaye; with the Gobblegook S. O
|Gobbledegook Songs (1957)
|1957
|-
|The Dancing Bear
|By Milton Kaye; with the Gobblegook S. O
|Gobbledegook Songs (1957)
|1957
|-
|I Live In Trafalgar Square
|By C.W. Murphy, first performed by Morny Cash in 1908
|Let's Have A Banana (2009)
|1958
|-
|Hello! Hello! Who's Your Lady Friend?
|By David Worton & Bert Lee; sung by Harry Fragson, 1911
|Let's Have A Banana (2009)
|1958
|-
|The Little Shirt My Mother Made for Me
|First recorded by Marty Robbins
|Let's Have A Banana (2009)
|1958
|-
|You Can Do a Lot of Things at the Seaside
|Written and originally performed by Mark Sheridan, 1901
|Let's Have A Banana (2009)
|1958
|-
|It'll All be the Same (A Hundred Years from Now)
|Unknown. Written in 1884
|Let's Have A Banana (2009)
|1958
|-
|My Word, You Do Look Queer
|By Weston and Lee
|Let's Have A Banana (2009)
|1958
|-
|And Yet I Don't Know!
|Unknown. Written in 1882
|Let's Have A Banana (2009)
|1958
|-
|I'm Shy, Mary Ellen, Im Shy
|Written and performed by Jack Pleasants in 1912
|Let's Have A Banana (2009)
|1958
|-
|Sweeney Todd the Barber
|By Weston and Lee 
|Let's Have A Banana (2009)
|1958
|-
|Oh, I Must Go Home Tonight!
|First performed by Billy Williams in 1908
|Let's Have A Banana (2009)
|1958
|-
|Eving's Dorg Ospital
|By Stanley Holloway
|Let's Have A Banana (2009)
|1958
|-
|Harry Champion Medley
|Includes "I'm Henery the Eighth, I Am", "Any Old Iron", "A Little Bit of Cucumber" and "Boiled Beef and Carrots" 
|Let's Have A Banana (2009)
|1958
|-
|The Spaniard That Blighted My Life
|First recorded by Billy Merson in 1911
|Let's Have A Banana (2009)
|1958
|-
|Let's All Go Down the Strand
|Words and music by Harry Castling and C. W. Murphy
|Let's Have A Banana (2009)
|1958
|-
|My Old Dutch
|By A.C. Ingle, first performed by Albert Chevalier in 1910
|Stanley Holloway At His Very Best (2008)
|1958
|-
|Phrenology
|By W.S.Gilbert
|Bab Ballads And Cautionary Tales (1958)
|1959
|-
|The Yarn of the Nancy Bell
|By W.S.Gilbert 
|Bab Ballads And Cautionary Tales (1958)
|1959
|-
|The Sensation Captain
|By W.S.Gilbert 
|Bab Ballads And Cautionary Tales (1958)
|1959
|-
|Babette's Love
|By W.S.Gilbert 
|Bab Ballads And Cautionary Tales (1958)
|1959
|-
|Ben Allah Achmet
|By W.S.Gilbert 
|Bab Ballads And Cautionary Tales (1958)
|1959
|-
|Peter the Wag
|By W.S.Gilbert 
|Bab Ballads And Cautionary Tales (1958)
|1959
|-
|The Ape and the Lady
|By W.S.Gilbert 
|Bab Ballads And Cautionary Tales (1958)
|1959
|-
|A Dark Girl Dressed in Blue
|By Harry Clifton (1868) 
|
|1959
|-
|Growing Old
|
|
|1959
|-
|Macbeth
|By William Shakespeare. Featuring Anthony Quayle, Ian Holm and Robert Hardy
|Macbeth by William Shakespeare ( 2012)
|1960
|-
|Petticoat Lane
|Performed by Holloway
|EMI Comedy Classics: Stanley Holloway (1991)
|1960
|-
|Sing a Song of London
|Written and originally performed by Ambrose 
|
|1960
|-
|Tommy the Whistler
|By Ernest Melvin. This Co-Optimists song was previously recorded by Holloway in 1923
|EMI Comedy Classics: Stanley Holloway (1991)
|1960
|-
|If I Should Plant a Tiny Seed of love
|First performed by Frank Summers (1909)
|Stanley Holloway At His Very Best (2008)
|1960
|-
|Any Old Iron
|By Charles Collins and Terry Sheppard first performed by Harry Champion in 1911 
|Stanley Holloway At His Very Best (2008)
|1960
|-
|A Bachelor Gay
|By James W. Tate (1916).
|Stanley Holloway At His Very Best (2008)
|1960
|-
|Where Did You Get that Hat
|Words and music by James Rolmaz, c.1888 
|Stanley Holloway At His Very Best (2008)
|1960
|-
|If You Were the Only Girl in the World
|By Clifford Grey recorded by George Robey in 1916 
|Stanley Holloway At His Very Best (2008)
|1960
|-
|Two Lovely Black Eyes
|Performed by Charles Coborn 1886
|Stanley Holloway At His Very Best (2008)
|1960
|-
|The Galloping Major
|Originally performed by George Bastow 1906
|Stanley Holloway At His Very Best (2008)
|1960
|-
|Join in the Chorus/Lily of Laguna
|By Leslie Stuart, originally performed by Eugene Stratton in 1898
|Stanley Holloway At His Very Best (2008)
|1960
|-
|While Strolling in the Park
|By Alfred Vance in 1868
|Stanley Holloway At His Very Best (2008)
|1960
|-
|Down at the Old Bull and Bush
|By Billy Murray.  Popularised by Florrie Forde.  The song was written about The Old Bull and Bush public house in Hampstead Heath, London
|Stanley Holloway At His Very Best (2008)
|1960
|-
|With Aspect Stern
|From "The Mikado" By W.S.Gilbert and Arthur Sullivan; with Groucho Marx
|Groucho Marx in the Mikado (2012)
|1960
|-
|The Criminal Cried
|From "The Mikado" By W.S.Gilbert and Arthur Sullivan; with Groucho Marx and Sharon Randal
|Groucho Marx in the Mikado (2012)
|1960
|-
|The Flowers That Bloom In The Spring
|From "The Mikado" By W.S.Gilbert and Arthur Sullivan; with Groucho Marx, Barbara Meister, Robert Rounseville and Sharon Randal
|Groucho Marx in the Mikado (2012)
|1960
|-
|Pick a pocket or two 
|From Oliver!, words and music by Lionel Bart; with studio cast 
|Oliver! London Studio Cast Soundtrack (1993) - LP
|1961
|-
|Reviewing the Situation 
|From Oliver!''', words and music by Lionel Bart; with studio cast 
|Oliver! London Studio Cast Soundtrack (1993) - LP
|1961
|-
|Be Back Soon
|From Oliver!, words and music by Lionel Bart; with studio cast 
|Oliver! London Studio Cast Soundtrack (1993) - LP
|1961
|-
|I'd do Anything
|From Oliver!, words and music by Lionel Bart; with studio cast 
|Oliver! London Studio Cast Soundtrack (1993) - LP
|1961
|-
|The Third Sam
|By Stanley Holloway
|
|1962
|-
|Hello, Dolly!
|by Jerry Herman
|
|1965
|-
|As Time Goes By
|By Herman Hupfeld
|
|1965
|-
|London Pride
|By Noël Coward
|More Monologues and Songs (2002)
|1965
|-
|I'm Old Fashioned
|By Johnny Mercer and Jerome Kern
|
|1965
|-
|Fishing
|By Leslie Sarony
|
|1965
|-
|That's Entertainment!
|By Arthur Schwartz and Howard Dietz
|
|1965
|-
|Comedy Tonight
|from A Funny Thing Happened on the Way to the Forum by Stephen Sondheim; originally performed by Zero Mostel
|EMI Comedy Classics: Stanley Holloway (1991)
|1965
|-
|The King's New Clothes
|By Frank Loesser
|
|1965
|-
|Try to Remember
|By Tom Jones and Harvey Schmidt
|
|1965
|-
|Burlington Bertie
|By Harry B. Norris 
|More Monologues and Songs (2002)
|1965
|-
|Summer Green - Winter White
|By Cyril Ornadel and Norman Newell
|
|1965
|-
|Hey, Look Me Over
|By Carolyn Leigh and Cy Coleman
|
|1965
|-
|It Were All Green Hills
|By Stanley Holloway 
|
|1974
|-
|My Word, You Do Look Queer
|Previously recorded by Holloway in 1958
|
|1975
|-
|Marksman Sam
|By Marriott Edgar and Stanley Holloway. Previously recorded by Holloway in 1934
|
|1975
|-
|The Parson Of Puddle
|By Greatrex Newman. Previously recorded by Holloway in 1938
|
|1975
|-
|Gunner Joe
|By Marriott Edgar. Previously recorded by Holloway in 1933
|
|1975
|-
|Hand In Hand
|By Jerome Kern and Oscar Hammerstein II. Previously recorded by Holloway in 1934
|
|1975
|-
|And Yet I Don't Know
|Previously recorded by Holloway in 1958
|
|1975
|-
|Albert's Reunion
|By Stanley Holloway. Previously recorded by Holloway in 1957
|
|1975
|-
||The Magna Charter
|By Marriott Edgar
|
|1975
|-
|Recumbent Posture
|By Marriott Edgar. Previously recorded by Holloway in 1939
|
|1975
|-
|Life Is What You Make It
|
|
|1975
|}

Original albums

 A Midsummer Nights Dream - 1954 (Audiobook)
 Champagne Charlie - 1954
 My Fair Lady (Original Cast) - 1956
 Stanley Holloway's Concert Party - 1957 
 Nonsense Verse Of Carroll And Lear - 1957
 Gobbledegook Songs - 1957
 The Concert Party -1958
 Ere's 'Olloway - 1958
 Alice In Wonderland - 1958
 Through The Looking Glass - 1958
 Bab Ballads And Cautionary Tales - 1958

 My Fair Lady (London Cast) - 1959
 Join In The Chorus - 1960
 The Mikado - 1960
 Geoffrey Chaucer- Canterbury Tales - 1962
 Oliver! - 1962
 As You Like It - 1962
 MacBeth - 1962
 My Fair Lady (Soundtrack) - 1964
 Stanley, I Presume - 1965
 The World Of Stanley Holloway - 1971
 Life In The Old Dog Yet - 1975

Compilation albums

 Let's all go to the Music Hall Original release August 1975
 EMI Comedy Classics: Stanley Holloway  – Original release date –  17 May 1991
 The Classic Monologues – Original release date – 4 September 2000
 His Greatest Performances – Original release date – 22 March 2001
 Monologues... And More! – Original release date – 5 November 2001
 Stanley Holloway The Best Of – Original release date – 29 April 2002
 Keep Smiling – Original release date – 3 June 2006
 Penny On The Drum – Original release date – 6 July 2006
 With A Little Bit O' Luck – The Songs and Monologues Of Stanley Holloway – Original release date – 7 May 2007
 The Essential Collection (2CD) – Original release date –  2 August 2007
 Stanley Holloway At His Very Best – Original release date – 26 February 2008
 Beat The Retreat – Original release date – 3 March 2008

 ere's 'olloway – Original release date – 18 November 2008
 Let's Have A Banana – Original release date – 3 January 2009
 British & American Comedy Legends – Original release date 1 August 2010 – Various Artists
 The Bab Ballads – Original release date – 20 August 2009
 Famous Adventures With Old Sam and the Ramsbottoms – Original release date – 3 January 2010
 Old Sam & Young Albert – Original Recordings 1930-1940
 War Songs That United a Country – the Complete Collection (War Songs That United a Country – the Complete Collection) – Original release date 1 January 2010 (featured only)
 Highlights From The Co-Optimists Various Recordings by original cast members. Tracks featuring Stanley Holloway Disc 1 tracks: 6, 8, 13, 15. Disc two tracks: 1, 2. – Original release date – 1 August 2008
 Stanley Holloway: Champagne Charlie – Original release date – 1 May 2011
 Macbeth by William Shakespeare'' – Original release date – 1 January 2012 (Audio book)

See also
 Stanley Holloway on stage and screen

References

Discographies of British artists